The following is a chronicle of events during the year 1977 in ice hockey.

National Hockey League
Art Ross Trophy as the NHL's leading scorer during the regular season: Guy Lafleur  
Hart Memorial Trophy: for the NHL's Most Valuable Player: Guy Lafleur 
Stanley Cup -  the Montreal Canadiens defeat the Boston Bruins in 1977 Stanley Cup Finals
With the first overall pick in the 1977 NHL Amateur Draft, Dale McCourt was selected by the Detroit Red Wings.

World Hockey Association
 The Quebec Nordiques won the Account World Trophy for the only time in franchise history

Canadian Hockey League
Ontario Hockey League:  J. Ross Robertson Cup.
Quebec Major Junior Hockey League:  won President's Cup (QMJHL) for the first time in team history
Western Hockey League:   President's Cup (WHL) for the first time in team history
Memorial Cup:

International hockey

World Hockey Championship

European hockey

Minor League hockey
AHL:   Calder Cup
IHL:   Turner Cup.
 Allan Cup:

Junior A hockey

University hockey
NCAA Division I Men's Ice Hockey Tournament

Births
 January 2 – Aleš Píša, Czech ice hockey player
 January 31 – Mark Dutiaume, Canadian winger
 February 7 – Paul Comrie, Canadian forward
 May 31 – Petr Tenkrát, Czech forward
 July 12 – Peter Schaefer, Canadian ice hockey player

Deaths

Season articles

See also
1977 in sports

References